Wrestle Poodles... And Win! is a live double album by the reunited Bonzo Dog Doo-Dah Band.  It was recorded at the London Astoria on 28 January 2006.

Track listing

Disc one (The Tigers Head Days) 
 "Rule Britannia"
 "Hunting Tigers"
 "My Brother Makes the Noises"
 "Doorstep"
 "Little Sir Echo"
 "Ali Baba's Camel"
 "Falling in Love Again"
 "Watermelon"
 "Lookout There’s a Monster Coming"
 "Whispering"
 "By a Waterfall"
 "The Sheik of Araby"
 "Hello Mabel"
 "Jollity Farm"
 "The Equestrian Statue"

Disc two (Into the Electric Era) 

 "Cool Britannia"
 "We Are Normal"
 "The Strain"
 "The Sound of Music"
 "Exodus"
 "The Trouser Press"
 "My Pink Half of the Drainpipe"
 "I’m Bored"
 "Sport (The Odd Boy)"
 "Mr Apollo"
 "Humanoid Boogie"
 "Tent"
 "Can Blue Men Sing the Whites"
 "Look at Me I'm Wonderful"
 "San Francisco"
 "Rhinocratic Oaths"
 "Mr Slater's Parrot"
 "Monster Mash"
 "Urban Spaceman"
 "Canyons of Your Mind"

There has also been a limited edition Picture Disk version released featuring a selection of songs from both disks 1 and 2.

External links 
 Album info from official Bonzo Dog site

Bonzo Dog Doo-Dah Band live albums
2006 live albums